Michael Harold Poepping (born August 7, 1950) is a former outfielder in Major League Baseball. He played for the Minnesota Twins.

References

External links

1950 births
Living people
Major League Baseball outfielders
Minnesota Twins players
Baseball players from Minnesota
People from Little Falls, Minnesota